Madanapur is a village and Mandal headquarters located in Wanaparthy district in the Telangana state of India.

Villages 
The villages in  Madanapur mandal include:

 Madanapur
 Govindahalli
 Dantanoor 
 Shankarampeta 
 Thirumalaipalle 
 Ramanpadu 
 Ajjakollu 
 Narsingapur 
 Narsingapur thanda
 Konnur
 konnur pedda thanda
 Dwarakanagar
 Nelividi
 Nelividi thanda
 Duppalle 
 Durable thanda
 Kothapalle
 Gopanpet
 Karvena
 Karvena thanda
 Bhavsingh thanda
 Bogguloni thanda
 Mumpu thanda

References 

Wanaparthy district
Mandals in Wanaparthy district
Census towns in Wanaparthy district